Thorvald Hansen (16 October 1891 – 13 February 1961) was a Danish weightlifter. He competed in the men's lightweight event at the 1920 Summer Olympics.

References

External links
 

1891 births
1961 deaths
Danish male weightlifters
Olympic weightlifters of Denmark
Weightlifters at the 1920 Summer Olympics
People from Helsingør
Sportspeople from the Capital Region of Denmark